While We're Young is a 2014 American comedy-drama film written, produced, and directed by Noah Baumbach. The film stars Ben Stiller, Naomi Watts, Adam Driver, and Amanda Seyfried; its plot centers on a New York-based documentary filmmaker and his wife, a couple in their 40s, who develop a friendship with a couple in their 20s. The film was screened in the Special Presentations section of the 2014 Toronto International Film Festival, and A24 released it in the United States on March 27, 2015. The film went on to gross more than any of Baumbach's previous films at the US box office.

Plot
Middle-aged couple Josh and Cornelia Srebnick are filmmakers living in a shaky marriage in New York City. Josh has spent the last 10 years struggling on the post-production of his documentary film about leftist intellectual Ira Mandelstam while not letting his producer wife help him with the project.

After finishing a lecture at the college where he teaches, Josh is approached by Jamie and Darby Massey, a young couple who invite him and Cornelia out to dinner. Jamie claims to be a fan of Josh's work and the works of his accomplished documentary filmmaker father-in-law, Leslie Breitbart. Josh is immediately awestruck by Jamie and Darby's non-conservative outlook on life as he and Cornelia begin spending more and more time with them, joining in on their bohemian lifestyle.

An aspiring filmmaker himself, Jamie talks with Josh about their projects, including Josh's own documentary. This inspires Jamie to make a film about connecting with an old high school friend that he found on Facebook. Jamie and Darby invite Josh and Cornelia to an ayahuasca ceremony where a hallucinating Cornelia kisses Jamie while Jamie receives Josh's approval in helping with the production of his film. Cornelia agrees to produce the film. Jamie and Josh find the old friend, Kent Arlington, who is in the hospital after a suicide attempt. Josh and Jamie discover that Kent was involved in a civilian massacre during an Army tour in Afghanistan, creating an even bigger story for Jamie's film.

While pitching his own film, Josh is dismayed when he cannot engage a potential hedge fund investor with the concept of his intellectual documentary. He goes to Leslie for a second opinion. When Leslie's criticisms and suggestions are brought down by Josh, they get into an argument over Josh and Cornelia's inability to have children, as well as Josh calling himself a disappointment to him.

Josh attends a party for a screening of Jamie's film, which is met far more positively by Leslie and the hedge fund investor. A jealous Josh argues with Cornelia over Jamie's success, and they separate. Josh meets up with Darby, who is sick of Jamie's increasingly self-centered attitude and tells him about Cornelia kissing Jamie. Josh confronts Cornelia the next morning and denounces Jamie.

While teaming up with his editor on cutting his film, Josh comes across footage for Jamie's film, finding evidence that suggests the meeting with Kent was actually staged. Finding him, Kent reveals that he was really friends with Darby, not Jamie, and that he was contacted by Jamie weeks before their shoot. Capturing his confession on camera, Josh goes to Jamie and Darby to confront him only to discover that a fed-up Darby is moving out and that Jamie is at the tribute celebrating Leslie at Lincoln Center.

Josh confronts Jamie in private at the event, admonishing him for compromising the truth and genuineness of his story for dramatic purposes. Josh forces Jamie to admit the truth to Leslie, who excuses it, saying that it's a good story regardless of the fabrication. Defeated, Josh admits to Leslie he was right about the edits needed on his film. Outside, Josh and Cornelia reconcile.

One year later, Josh and Cornelia drive to the airport for a flight to Port-au-Prince, Haiti where they will adopt a newborn baby. Josh finds an article in a magazine lauding Jamie as a filmmaking genius, which Cornelia and Josh pass off by admitting, "He's not evil, he's just young." They then watch a young child at the gate playing with an iPhone, studying him as if to imply that yet another generation with disparate ethics and morals is approaching.

Cast

Peter Bogdanovich appears as an MC at an event celebrating Leslie Breitbart, and Greta Lee voices a Sundance interviewer.

Production

Filming
The film was spotted shooting on September 17, 2013 in New York City.

Music
The film score was composed by James Murphy.

 "Golden Years" – James Murphy
 "Concerto for Lute, 2 Violins and Continuo in D, RV. 93" – Antonio Vivaldi
 "All Night Long (All Night)"– Lionel Richie
 "Buggin' Out" – A Tribe Called Quest
 "The Ghost in You" – The Psychedelic Furs
 "The Inch Worm" – Danny Kaye
 "Only the Stars Above Welcome Me Home" – James Murphy
 "Falling (Duke Dumont Remix)" – Haim
 "Eye of the Tiger" – Survivor
 "Andante du Concerto Pour Flautino en ut Majeur" (from the MGM film The Wild Child) – Antonio Vivaldi
 "Waiting for a Girl Like You" – Foreigner
 "Nineteen Hundred and Eighty-Five" – Paul McCartney & Wings
 "We Used to Dance" – James Murphy
 "Golden Years" – David Bowie

Release
The film premiered at the 2014 Toronto International Film Festival on September 6, 2014. Shortly after, A24 acquired distribution rights to the film for $4 million.

Box office
The film opened in limited release on March 27, 2015 and earned $227,688, ranking number 24 in the box office that weekend. On April 17, the film was given a wide release and grossed $1,438,384, ranking number 12. The film eventually grossed $7,587,485 domestically, more than all of Baumbach's previous films in the United States box office.

Critical response
On Rotten Tomatoes, the film has an approval rating of 84%, based on 205 reviews, with an average rating of 7.32/10. The site's consensus is "Poignant and piercingly honest, While We're Young finds writer-director Noah Baumbach delivering some of his funniest lines through some of his most relatable characters." On Metacritic the film has a weighted average score of 77 out of 100, based on reviews from 44 critics, indicating "generally favorable reviews".

Peter Debruge of Variety wrote: "Though While We’re Young is primarily a comedy — and a very funny one at that, managing to be both blisteringly of-the-moment and classically zany in the same breath — Baumbach has bitten off several serious topics, for which laughter serves as the most agreeable way to engage."
Richard Roeper of the Chicago Sun-Times wrote: "If While We’re Young hadn’t gone quite so broad at the finish line, it would be a contender for my favorite movie of the still-young year."

Todd McCarthy of The Hollywood Reporter called it a "mostly engaging but only fitfully inspired serio-comedy."

Notes
The film opens with a quote from Henrik Ibsen's play The Master Builder.

References

External links

 
 
 
 
 
 Official screenplay

2014 films
2014 comedy-drama films
2014 independent films
A24 (company) films
American comedy-drama films
American independent films
Films about adoption
Films about film directors and producers
Films about marriage
Films directed by Noah Baumbach
Films produced by Scott Rudin
Films set in 2014
Films set in New York City
Films shot in New York City
Midlife crisis films
2010s English-language films
2010s American films